Chyasal Stadium (previously known as Chyasal ANFA Technical Football Center) is a multi-purpose stadium in the Chyasal neighborhood of Lalitpur in Bagmati Province of Nepal. It is mainly used for soccer matches and has a grass playing surface.

History
The stadium was built in 2002 with the support of FIFA's soccer development project in South Asia.
In 2017, the National Sports Council decided to upgrade the training grounds into a functional football stadium with constructions finished in 2021.

Hosted events
regular matches of Martyr's Memorial A-Division League
 Nepal Super League

References

Football venues in Nepal
Multi-purpose stadiums in Nepal
2002 establishments in Nepal